Eduardo Santos (born 29 June 1899, date of death unknown) was a Portuguese sports shooter. He competed in the 50 m rifle event at the 1936 Summer Olympics.

References

1899 births
Year of death missing
Portuguese male sport shooters
Olympic shooters of Portugal
Shooters at the 1936 Summer Olympics
Place of birth missing